The Miss Spain 2008 pageant was held on March 29, 2008. It was the 68th edition of Miss Spain. There were 52 candidates for the national title. The winner will represent Spain at Miss Universe 2008. The First Runner Up would enter Miss World 2008. The Second Runner Up would enter Miss International 2008. The finalist would go to small pageants. Eventually, Patricia Yurena Rodríguez classified as one of the Top 15 Semi-finalist at Miss World 2008, Claudia Moro classified as one of the Top 10 Finalist at Miss Universe 2008 and Alejandra Andreu became Miss International 2008.

Due to Miss Universe eligibility regulations that state every contestant must be 18 before February 1, Rodríguez was ineligible to attend Miss Universe 2008 in Nha Trang, Vietnam and first runner-up Claudia Moro of Madrid went instead.

Results

Special awards
 Miss Photogenic (voted by press reporters) - Lorena Blasco (Alicante)
 Miss Congeniality (voted by Miss Spain contestants) - Silvia Muñoz (Córdoba)
 Miss Internet - Patricia Yurena Rodríguez (Tenerife)
 Best Look - Vianca Rodríguez (Melilla)
 Best Face - Claudia Moro (Madrid)

Delegates

Judges
Ana Antic
victor cucart
beatriz cortazar
Javier de Montini
Heike Ferrari
Paloma Lago
Juan García Postigo
Daniel Muriel

External links
https://web.archive.org/web/20090122112104/http://www.laguiatv.com/especiales/miss-mister-espana/miss-2008

Miss Spain
2008 in Spain
2008 beauty pageants
2000s in the Valencian Community